Freaks Out is a 2021 Italian historical-fantasy drama film directed by Gabriele Mainetti.

It was entered in the main competition at the 78th Venice International Film Festival.
It received mostly positive reviews, with critics praising the acting, cinematography, production value and themes, but some criticism towards excessive length and lack of focus. It won the Leoncino d'Oro award at the 78th Venice Film Festival, and the VriendenLoterij Audience Award at the 51st Rotterdam Film Festival.

Plot
In 1943, in the middle of the World War II, shows is running of the Circus Mezzapiotta, owned by the Jew Israel. Four freaks perform there: Matilde, a girl who produces electricity and electrocutes anyone who touches her; Cencio, an albino boy who can control all insects; Fulvio, a "man-beast" suffering from hypertrichosis, and therefore covered in hair from head to toe, endowed with superhuman strength; and finally Mario, a dwarf with a slight mental retardation and the ability to manipulate metal objects. The worsening of the conflict puts the survival of the Circus at risk, so Israel proposes that the four of them attempt to travel to America; Fulvio, on the other hand, proposes that they find work at the prestigious Berlin Zircus, a sumptuous show put on by the Nazis who have occupied Rome. The Zircus is actually the realm of Franz, a German pianist with six fingers on each hand who possesses clairvoyant powers: he had a premonition of Hitler's suicide and the arrival of four beings with superhuman powers that could save the fate of the Third Reich (as well as various events and inventions that will happen in the years following the end of the conflict); for this reason he created the Zircus in order to gather all the freaks in the area, who undergo deadly torture in an attempt to identify the saviors.

Israel manages to convince the four freaks to leave for America, but after collecting their savings he disappears. After fortunately escaping a roundup in an attempt to go looking for him in Rome, the four decide to separate: Matilde, the only one who believes in Israel's good faith, leaves to look for him, while the other three go to the Berlin Zircus. Matilde avoids an attempted rape by a German soldier, and saves herself by electrocuting him with her powers; she is then saved by a shabby group of partisans led by the Hunchback, who tries to use her power for their cause. Thanks to their help, Matilde manages to track down Israel aboard a truck on its way to the concentration camps, but she is unable to save him because she is unable to control her power, nor to use it to harm anyone. She will later reveal to the Hunchback that she had unintentionally killed her own mother, which led her to fear herself and her power.

Fulvio, Mario and Cencio are hired at the Berlin Zircus, where they attract the attention of Franz, who subjects them to painful tortures. Matilde is informed by Guercio, another partisan, of the real purpose of the Zircus, and leaves to save her friends; however, she is captured by Franz, who begins to believe that the four freaks are the ones who appeared in his vision; so he organizes a big show to show them to his brother Amon and to Field Marshal Kesselring, in order to convince them to employ them in the War. During the show Franz tries to force Matilde to electrocute a tiger, but the girl is able for the first time to control her power and manages to save the animal instead; humiliated and mocked, Franz condemns the four freaks to the stake. Matilde, however, succeeds in blowing up the door of their cell, and the four friends leave to save Israel, who is traveling on one of the death trains. Learning of their escape, Franz realizes that the four are in fact the ones he is looking for, and that destiny will be fulfilled at a train station he saw in a premonition. In pursuit of them, the German kills Amon and assumes his identity, wearing his uniform and even cutting off his excessive fingers, and then places himself at the head of the army.

Using all their powers, the four friends manage to defeat the German soldiers and save Israel and the other Jews, but are immediately attacked by the army led by Franz. Despite the intervention of the Hunchback's partisans and the powers of the four freaks, the Germans seem to prevail. When Israel sacrifices himself to save her life, Matilde finally succeeds in taking full control of her power and concentrates it in a huge explosion of energy, which annihilates all the German soldiers. While witnessing the death of his fiancée Irina, Franz understands that his vision was not about Hitler's suicide, but his own: in fact, shortly after, realizing that his plan failed, he kills himself. The four freaks, finally free, can start traveling again.

Cast
Claudio Santamaria as Fulvio
Pietro Castellitto as Cencio
Giancarlo Martini as Mario
Aurora Giovinazzo as Matilde
Giorgio Tirabassi as Israel
Max Mazzotta as The Hunchback
Franz Rogowski as Franz

Release
Originally set to be released on 22 October 2020, the date was delayed to 16 December, and then pushed back again due to the second wave of the COVID-19 pandemic in Italy. The film was finally scheduled to be released on 28 October 2021.

Reception
Review aggregator Rotten Tomatoes gives the film a 67% approval rating based on 9 reviews, with an average rating of 8/10.

References

External links

2021 films
2021 drama films
Films set in Rome
Films set in 1943
Films postponed due to the COVID-19 pandemic
Italian drama films
2020s Italian-language films
Italian Campaign of World War II films
2020s Italian films